Yaylayolu can refer to:

 Yaylayolu, Aşkale
 Yaylayolu, Tercan